The Chepstow Gleaner was a 19th-century Welsh periodical, first produced by Clark and Son, Printers and Publishers, in Bank Square, Chepstow, Wales, in 1849. It contained articles on subjects of general interest, as well as extracts from published works and poetry.

References 

Periodicals published in Wales
Magazines published in Wales